Samson Ndayishimiye (born April 12, 1980) is a retired Rwandan swimmer who specialized in sprint freestyle events. Ndayishimiye competed for Rwanda in the men's 50 m freestyle at the 2000 Summer Olympics in Sydney. He received a ticket from FINA, under a Universality program, without meeting an entry time. He challenged six other swimmers in heat one, including 16-year-olds Wael Ghassan of Qatar and Hassan Mubah of the Maldives. With one swimmer casting out of the race for a no false-start rule, Ndayishimiye rounded out the field to last place in a time of 38.76, the slowest of all-time in the heats. Ndayishimiye failed to advance into the semifinals, as he placed seventy-fourth overall out of 80 swimmers in the prelims.

References

1980 births
Living people
Rwandan male freestyle swimmers
Olympic swimmers of Rwanda
Swimmers at the 2000 Summer Olympics